RSHP is a British architectural firm, founded in 1977 and previously known as the Richard Rogers Partnership which became Rogers Stirk Harbour + Partners. in 2007. The firm rebranded from Rogers Stirk Harbour + Partners to simply RSHP on 30 June 2022, after retirement and death of Richard Rogers. Its main offices are located in the Leadenhall Building, London completed to the firm's designs in 2014. Previously they were at the Thames Wharf Studios. In its various incarnations it ihas designed many important buildings including the Lloyd's building and the Millennium Dome in London  and the Senedd building in Cardiff.

Description
In addition to the principal offices the firm also maintains offices in Shanghai and Sydney.  the firm has thirteen partners, including Graham Stirk and Ivan Harbour. The practice is run with a profit-share scheme and a limit on the directors' salaries in comparison with those of the lowest paid in the office.

It is owned by a charitable trust, ensuring that no individual owns any share in its value and preventing private trading and inheritance of shares. The practice divides its profits between all of the staff and their chosen charities, according to publicly declared principles.

The practice is strongly focused on sustainability, urban regeneration and social awareness. Celebration of public space and the encouragement of public activities is also a recurring theme.

History 

Soon after the Pompidou Centre in Paris was opened in 1977, Richard Rogers formed the Richard Rogers Partnership and started work on the Lloyd's building in London. Richard Rogers explained the reason for the change of the practice name from the Richard Rogers Partnership to Rogers Stirk Harbour + Partners in 2007 was because "We wanted to avoid the situation where the name of the practice is someone who died 100 years ago. Architecture is a living thing. If I want to leave something to the future, it has to be able to change – but retain something of the ethos that we built up over 50 years."

In November 2015 Rogers Stirk Harbour created five new partners including Tracy Meller who became their first female partner. Founding partner Mike Davies stepped down.

In June 2022 the company rebranded to RSHP, following the retirement and death of Richard Rogers.

Awards 
In 2006 the practice was awarded the Stirling Prize for their Madrid-Barajas Airport, Terminal 4.

In 2008, RSHP was awarded the Manser Medal for Houses and Housing, given for the best one-off house (Oxley Woods) designed by an architect in the UK.

In 2009 it was awarded the Stirling Prize for Maggie's Centre in London. It won the RIBA National Award 2015 for NEO Bankside luxury apartments in London and was subsequently shortlisted for the Stirling Prize for the second time.

Notable projects 

This list contains projects from the beginning of the partnership in 1977 through to the present day. For earlier work by Richard Rogers, Team 4, Richard and Su Rogers and Piano + Rogers, see the Richard Rogers page.

The Richard Rogers Partnership

RSHP (and formerly Rogers Stirk Harbour + Partners)

Key personnel 

Partners of the firm  were Richard Rogers, Mike Davies, Graham Stirk, Ivan Harbour, Andrew Morris, Lennart Grut, Richard Paul, Ian Birtles and Simon Smithson

Current personnel

 Ivan Harbour 

Ivan Harbour joined Richard Rogers Partnership in 1985, in 1993 he was made a senior director. In 2007 the practice changed from Richard Rogers Partnership to Rogers Stirk Harbour + Partners. Harbour led the design team for the Senedd (National Assembly for Wales building), Terminal 4 Barajas Airport, Madrid (winner of the 2006 Stirling Prize), the Law Courts in Antwerp and Bordeaux and the European Court of Human Rights building in Strasbourg.

Harbour was lead architect for the Madrid Airport Terminal 4 project and Project Director for the first Maggie's Cancer Centre in London (winner of the 2009 Stirling Prize), and 300 New Jersey Avenue, an office building in Washington DC (due for completion in Summer 2009).

 Graham Stirk 

Graham Stirk joined Richard Rogers Partnership in 1983 and was made a senior director in 1995. In 2007 the practice changed from Richard Rogers Partnership to Rogers Stirk Harbour + Partners. He has been involved in the design of a number of projects in the UK as well as projects worldwide, including Japan, USA, France, Italy, Spain, Germany and Ireland.

Stirk is the Design Director of several major projects, including a 48-storey office tower at 122 Leadenhall Street that could become the tallest tower in the City of London and NEO Bankside in London, a residential scheme consisting of 229 apartments and an extension to the British Museum. Stirk also contributed to the design of several key masterplanning projects including Potsdamer Platz, Berlin and Paddington Basin, London. Stirk was Director in Charge of the expansion to the Lloyds Register of Shipping building at 71 Fenchurch Street, One Hyde Park and 88 Wood Street.

Previous personnel

 Richard Rogers 

Richard Rogers won most of the major awards available to architects, including the Royal Gold Medal in 1985, the Praemium Imperiale in 2000 and the 2007 Pritzker Prize. He was knighted in 1991 and made a life peer in 1996. In addition the practice has won numerous awards for individual buildings including the Stirling Prize twice, for Barajas Airport and the Maggie's Centre at Charing Cross Hospital.

He was the 2007 Pritzker Architecture Prize Laureate and was knighted in 1991 and made a life peer in 1996.

Rogers' first work came when he co-founded Team 4 in 1963 with Su Brumwell, Wendy Cheesman and Norman Foster.  Team 4's first project was Creek Vean, a residential property in Cornwall. Team 4 dissolved in 1967. He then established a partnership with Su Rogers (née Brumwell), John Young and Laurie Abbott in 1967. By July 1971 Rogers had won a design competition to build the Pompidou Centre in Paris with co-partner with Italian architect Renzo Piano.

In 1977 he established the Richard Rogers Partnership with Marco Goldschmied and Mike Davies, where they went on to design the Lloyd's building and Millennium Dome both in London, the Senedd in Cardiff, and the European Court of Human Rights building in Strasbourg. 

In September 2020, Rogers announced that he had stepped down from the practice and that his name would be removed from the firm's in due course. He had formally retired from the board  in June of the same year. 

Mike Davies

Mike Davies was a founding partner of the Richard Rogers Partnership and a senior partner in RSHP. He joined the partnership between Richard Rogers and Renzo Piano in 1971, shortly after they won the commission to design the Pompidou Centre in Paris, and later became one of the founding directors of the Richard Rogers Partnership in 1977.

Davies was the project director for the Millennium Dome in London and for Terminal 5 at Heathrow Airport and is currently project director for Grand Paris. He stepped down from his role in the company at the end of 2015.

Rogers Stirk Harbour reorganised the business at the end of 2015 and Davies stepped down from his role as a partner in the company. He continued working for them in a part-time capacity.

 Marco Goldschmied 

Marco Goldschmied first joined Richard Rogers in 1969.

He was co-founder of the Richard Rogers Partnership along with Mike Davies and John Young in 1977 became its managing director in 1984. He left the practice on 30 June 2004. Rogers and Goldschmied were involved in a £10 million lawsuit, which was settled out of court in 2006, where the Richard Rogers Partnership would remain in the property along with River Café.

 Laurie Abbott 

Laurie Abbott joined Team 4 as an assistant architect, working on Creek Vean in Cornwall.
 
He built small development of properties in Frimley, was a senior director at the Richard Rogers Partnership, and was involved in the Pompidou Centre and the Lloyd's building.

 Amanda Levete 

Amanda Levete was born 17 November 1955. She joined the Richard Rogers Partnership in 1984, and left in 1989 to join Jan Kaplický as a partner in Future Systems.

 John Young 

Richard and Su Rogers along with John Young and Laurie Abbott, went into partnership after Team 4 had dissolved. He continued to work with Richard Rogers while in the Piano + Rogers partnership. Young along with Goldschmeid, Davies and Rogers set up the Richard Rogers Partnership in 1976.

 Other notable staff 
Numerous other architects worked in the practice before founding their own firms. They include Eva Jiricna, Alan Stanton, Chris Wilkinson, and Jan Kaplicky.

Notes

External links
 
 
 Profile of Richard Rogers, Graham Stirk and Ivan Harbour

Architecture firms based in London
British companies established in 2007
Richard Rogers
2007 in London
2007 establishments in England